Songs of Conscience and Concern: A Retrospective Collection is a 1999 compilation album by American folk group Peter, Paul and Mary. It was the group's second compilation, following 1970's Ten Years Together: The Best of Peter, Paul & Mary. Drawn primarily from the trio's 1980s and 1990s material, it's a profile of the group's most serious songs from their second phase. The sole new song, "Don't Laugh At Me", has since become a classic in its own right, evidenced by its inclusion on their most recent greatest hits album from Rhino Records.

Track listing
Wasn't That a Time
Pastures of Plenty
Power
If I Were Free
Coming of the Roads
El Salvador
The Great Mandala
All My Trials
All Mixed Up
Danny's Downs
Don't Laugh at Me
Home Is Where the Heart Is
There But for Fortune
Old Coat
Because All Men Are Brothers

References

1999 compilation albums
Peter, Paul and Mary albums
Albums produced by David Kahne
Albums produced by Phil Ramone
Warner Records compilation albums